The Pittsburgh Athletic Association was a private social club and athletic club in Pittsburgh, Pennsylvania, USA. Its clubhouse is listed on the National Register of Historic Places.

Located at the corner of Fifth Avenue and Bigelow Boulevard in the city's Oakland district, it faces three other landmark buildings: the University of Pittsburgh's Cathedral of Learning and William Pitt Union (formerly The Schenley Hotel) as well as the Soldiers and Sailors National Military Museum and Memorial. The latter, as well as the nearby Twentieth Century Club, being designed by noted architect, Benno Janssen.

The club was organized in 1908 by real estate developer Franklin Nicola. Architect Benno Janssen (1874—1964) used a Venetian Renaissance palace as a prototype for his design, perhaps Palazzo Grimani or Libreria on Piazza San Marco. The structure was completed in 1911. Prior to that, the club operated out of the Farmer's Bank Building (now razed), downtown at Forbes St (then Diamond) and Smithfield.

The Pittsburgh Athletic Association was a nonprofit membership club chartered in 1908, operating to 2017.

It offered comprehensive athletic facilities, sports lessons, spa services, fine dining, and overnight accommodations. Some of the building's more interesting features include a pool on the third floor, full basketball and squash courts, a 16 lane bowling alley, and a room dedicated to former University of Pittsburgh football coach Johnny Majors. The club had several annual events, the most popular including an Easter brunch, a lobster dinner, and collegiate boxing events.

From 1916 to 1920, the PAA fielded an elite amateur ice hockey team featuring such Canadian stars as Herb Drury and brothers Joe and Larry McCormick. The team won the championship of the short-lived National Amateur Hockey League in 1918. When the Olympic Games first included ice hockey in 1920, four of the eleven players on the silver medal-winning U.S. team came from the PAA squad.

The clubhouse is currently undergoing a complete renovation and restoration after which the club will be housed in a smaller space incorporating athletics, lap pool, and fine dining. It is slated to reopen in 2020.

In film
In 2009, the film Love & Other Drugs, directed by Edward Zwick and starring Jake Gyllenhaal and Hank Azaria, filmed a scene in the Pittsburgh Athletic Association's Grill Room. The 2010 film, She's Out of My League was partly filmed in the bowling alley.

See also
 List of American gentlemen's clubs
 Schenley Farms Historic District

References

External links

Pittsburgh Athletic Association Building homepage
Pittsburgh Athletic Association homepage

1908 establishments in Pennsylvania
Athletics clubs in the United States
Clubhouses on the National Register of Historic Places in Pennsylvania
Clubs and societies in Pennsylvania
Organizations based in Pittsburgh
Pittsburgh History & Landmarks Foundation Historic Landmarks
Gentlemen's clubs in the United States
National Register of Historic Places in Pittsburgh
Individually listed contributing properties to historic districts on the National Register in Pennsylvania
Clubhouses in Pittsburgh